Ukrainian Autocephalous Orthodox Church Canonical (UAOC-C) is an independent Orthodox Church, that declares its canonical origin from the Polish Orthodox Church.

History

From the Ukrainian Orthodox Church 

Metropolitan Dionysius was elevated into the Bishop dignity in 1913 by Gregorios IV, the Patriarch of Antioch, who is considered as having the ordination in the lineage of the Apostle Peter.

In 1932, Metropolitan Dionisius ordained Metropolitan Polycarp (Sikorsky), and in 1942, appointed him to the Nazi-occupied Ukraine for the renewing of UAOC and ordination of new bishops. Thus, all the hierarchy of UAOC in 1942 received the canonical ordinations of Bishops in the lineage of Apostle Peter. Among the ordained into Bishops were the deceased Patriarch Mstyslav (Skrypnyk) and Metropolitan Hryhoriy Ohiychuk.

UAOC-Sobornopravna 

In October 2002, in the USA was held the Council of the hierarchs of UAOC-Sobornopravna of North and South America – the branch from Polish Orthodox Church that was headed by  Metropolitan Hryhoriy (Ohiychuk) and after his death in 1985, by Metropolitan Andriy (Prazsky) (1985–90), then by Metropolitan Alexis (Nizza) (1990–99), then by Metropolitan Stephan (Babiy-Petrovich) (1999–2004). The Council of the hierarchs of UAOC-Sobornopravna, having considered the current situation of UAOC in Ukraine, decreed to:
 return the ancient patriarchal model to the church system of UAOC-Sobornopravna;
 resume the presence on the Ukrainian land by the establishment of Archdiocese of Kyiv and All Rus-Ukraine;
 elevate Archimandrite Moses (Koulik) into the dignity of Bishop and assign in the rank of Metropolitan of Kyiv and All Rus-Ukraine to Ukraine for the establishment of Archdiocese of Kyiv and All Rus-Ukraine.

On 10 October 2002, The consecration and elevation to the rank of Metropolitan of Kyiv and All Rus-Ukraine of Bishop Moses (Koulik) took place in the Boris and Gleb Cathedral of city Cleveland, Ohio, USA.  Metropolitan Moses is assigned to Ukraine "for the re-establishment of Kyivan Metropolitanate and the revival of UAOC-Sobornopravna in Ukraine with the right to complete administrative management and spiritual care".

On 1 November 2002, in a press-conference held, Metropolitan Stephan (Babiy-Petrovich), the Primate of UAOC-Sobornopravna of North and South America, dedicated to the historical Council of UAOC-Sobornopravna hierarchs and its decision as for return of Church from Diaspora to the territory of Ukraine.

In 2004–2005, UAOC-Sobornopravna in the USA saw events that changed cardinally the status of UAOC-Sobornopravna in Ukraine. UAOC-Sobornopravna of North and South America became UAOC of North and South America and Diaspora and, headed by metropolitan  Mykhayil (Yavchak-Champion) joined with UAOC in Ukraine, declaring Metropolitan Mefodiy (Kudriakov) to be their Primate.

The UAOC-Sobornopravna in Ukraine, headed by Metropolitan Moses, kept apart from this union and acquired the status of independent jurisdiction. Metropolitan Moses realized the active educational work, converting into Christianity a great number of atheists in the post-totalitarian Ukraine and called upon the unification of the scattered Ukrainians all over the world.

UAOC-Canonical 

On 17–18 June 2005, on the Feast of the Holy Trinity, in Kyiv, the Hierarchs Council of UAOC-Sobornopravna under the omophorion of Moses, Metropolitan of Kyiv and All Rus-Ukraine took place, where the name of the Church was asserted as UAOC-Canonical by the decision of the Holy Synod and by the decision of the Ecumenical Hierarchs Council.

Patriarch

On 17–18 June 2005, by the decision of the Holy Synod and by the decision of the Ecumenical Bishop's Council of UAOC-Canonical, under the action of the Holy Spirit, Metropolitan Moses was elected and enthroned into the dignity of Patriarch of Kyiv and All Rus-Ukraine. 12 Hierarchs, the clergy and the hundreds of the faithful from all over the world took part in the Holy Council.

The enthronement took place on the Feast of the Holy Trinity in the orthodox sanctuary of the people of Ukraine, in the principal Temple of Ukraine - the Saint Sophia Cathedral in Kyiv.

Doctrine

Ukrainian Autocephalous Orthodox Church-Canonical acknowledges the absolute faith in the teaching of Jesus Christ, the faith in the Holy Scripture and in the  Apostolic Canons. The clergy have the canonical ordinations from Jesus Christ in the lineage of the Apostle Peter.

See also

 Patriarch Moses (Koulik)
 History of Christianity in Ukraine
 Ukrainian Orthodox Church
 Ukrainian Orthodox Church of the USA
 Ukrainian Orthodox Church of Canada
 Eastern Orthodox Church
 Eastern Orthodox Church organization

References

External links
 Official Site of Ukrainian Autocephalous Orthodox Church-Canonical
 Ukrainian Autocephalous Orthodox Church — Canonical Ukrainian Autocephalous Orthodox Church - Canonical Elevates Metropolitan to Patriarch Moisey (article)